The Princess Royal Hospital, Kingston upon Hull was an acute general hospital in Kingston upon Hull, England.

History
The hospital was established as the Sutton Annexe to the Hull Royal Infirmary on a site donated by Sir Philip Reckitt, chairman of Reckitt and Sons, and was built between 1928 and 1931. After services transferred to the Castle Hill Hospital, the Princess Royal Hospital closed in summer 2008. It was demolished in spring 2012.

References

Defunct hospitals in England
Hospitals in Kingston upon Hull
Demolished buildings and structures in England
Buildings and structures demolished in 2012